Ostrva is a 1963 German-Yugoslav drama film directed by Jovan Zivanovic and starring Peter Van Eyck, Elke Sommer, Blazenka Katalinic and Tori Jankovic. A young recently divorced German tourist is hired by a concerned mother to visit her son, who is living a hermit life on an island in the Adriatic Sea, and persuade him to come home. Instead she falls in love with him and his life in seclusion.

Cast
 Peter Van Eyck - Peter
 Elke Sommer - Elke
 Blazenka Katalinic - Peter's Mother
 Tori Jankovic
 Edith Schultze-Westrum

References

External links 
 

1963 films
1963 drama films
German drama films
West German films
Yugoslav drama films
1960s German-language films
Serbo-Croatian-language films
Films set on islands
Films set in the Mediterranean Sea
1960s German films